Aquae Novae in Proconsulari is a former Ancient city and bishopric in Roman Africa and present Latin Catholic titular see.

Its modern location are the ruins of Sidi-Ali-Djebin, in present Tunisia.

History 
Aquae Novae was important enough in the Roman province of Africa Proconsularis to become one of the many suffragans of its capital Carthage's Metropolitan Archbishopric, but faded.

Titular see 
The diocese was nominally restored in 1933 as a titular bishopric.

It has had the following incumbents, all of the lowest (episcopal) rank :
 Jean-Marie-Clément Badré (1964.06.22 – 1969.12.10)
 Braulio Sánchez Fuentes, S.D.B. (1970.01.14 – 1978.02.15)
 Laurent Monsengwo Pasinya (1980.02.13 – 1988.09.01) (later Cardinal)
 Vilmos Dékány, Sch.P. (1988.12.23 – 2000.05.19)
 Louis-Marie Ling Mangkhanekhoun (2000.10.30 – ...), Apostolic Vicar of Pakse (Laos)

See also 
 Aquae in Proconsulari
 Aquae Novae in Numidia
 Catholic Church in Tunisia

References

External links 
 GCatholic with titular incumbent biography links

Catholic titular sees in Africa